Edward "Punch" Andrews is a music producer who produced many albums of Bob Seger and The Silver Bullet Band. Andrews has also served as a manager for Seger as well as Kid Rock, and managed Grand Funk Railroad during the mid-1990s.

References 

Year of birth missing (living people)
Living people
American music managers
American record producers
Ross School of Business alumni